Double J (formerly Dig Music) is an Australian digital radio station owned by the Australian Broadcasting Corporation. It is positioned as a spin-off of the youth-oriented Triple J catered towards an older adult audience, emphasizing genres such as pop, rock, blues, country, soul, jazz and world music, as well as archive content from Triple J's library. Currently it is mostly automated, but has a few regular live programs.

It is available terrestrially via DAB+, as well as other online and digital television platforms.

History

Dig Music (2002 – 2014)
ABC Dig Music began in November 2002 (double j was originally the name for triple j in the mid 70's, but was changed to triple j when the station switched to FM). It emerged from formats developed by Bill Gates and Phil Cullen at ABC Coast FM, which broadcast an Adult Alternative music format and was for many years ABC Radio's only continuous stream. It was part of a suite of three digital channels, alongside Dig Jazz and Dig Country.

Some ABC Local Radio, ABC Radio National and Triple J music programs, were also broadcast on ABC Dig Music.

In July 2009, Dig Radio, Dig Jazz and Dig Country was rebranded as the launch of digital radio stations ABC Dig Music, ABC Jazz and Country.

Double J (2014 – 2015)

On 24 October 2013, the station came under the management of Triple J.

On 28 April 2014, Dig Music signed off, and began stunting with a loop of "Express Yourself" by N.W.A. (an homage to a May 1990 industrial action by Triple J relating to another song by the same group), as well as covers of the song by Darren Hanlon and The Audreys.

At Noon on 30 April 2014, Dig Music officially relaunched as Double J (an homage to the original name of 2JJ), with former Triple J announcer Myf Warhurst hosting "Lunch with Myf". The launch was also broadcast live on Triple J, replacing "Lunch with Lewi" for that day.

On 19 January 2015, the station broadcast a special day of programming, Beat the Drum Again, to mark 2JJ's 40th anniversary. It included programs staffed by historic personalities such as Mikey Robins and Helen Razer, Angela Catterns, Chris & Craig, Roy & HG, and rebroadcasts of the original station's first hour on the air, and Midnight Oil's 1985 "Oils on the Water" concert on Goat Island (which was part of Triple J's 10th anniversary).

Double J (2015 – present)
In 2018 Zan Rowe moved from Triple J to digital radio network Double J as host of the Mornings show. The show is the home of her flagship feature and podcast, the Take 5.  The segment has featured many guests over the years including Sir Paul McCartney, Tool, Kacey Musgraves, Mark Ronson, Tori Amos, Ice Cube, and Peter Garrett.

In November 2020 the Take 5 podcast won Gold at the 2020 Australian Podcast Awards for Best Radio Podcast. 

In November 2020 Inside The Big Day Out won Silver at the 2020 Australian Podcast Awards for Best Documentary Podcast.

In November 2021 the Take 5 podcast won Bronze at the 2021 Australian Podcast Awards for Best Radio Podcast.

Petition for expansion
In March 2022, a group of female Australian singer-songwriters wrote to federal communications minister Paul Fletcher and shadow communications minister Michelle Rowland requesting that Double J be granted an FM license to enable the station to have a broader reach by allowing it to expand into regional areas of the country.

Missy Higgins, Kasey Chambers, Kate Miller-Heidke, Sarah Blasko, Vikki Thorn and Deborah Conway said that ageing female artists get much less exposure on FM radio than their male counterparts and noted there was no female equivalent to male-orientated FM station Triple M. They said Double J was a station that played a lot of new music by female artists over the age of 30 but its reach was "severely limited".  They said an expansion of the station by granting it an FM license, enabling access to a much wider audience, could be a way of getting closer to equality. The women also launched a Change.org petition to garner support from fans.

In response, Rowland and shadow arts minister Tony Burke said moving Double J onto the FM band would be a positive step for Australian music. They said if the Opposition was elected to power at the 2022 Australian federal election, they would examine the issue and work with the ABC and ACMA and consult with musicians. However, they didn't commit to the plan outright.

While visiting the Byron Bay Bluesfest during the campaign, Opposition leader Anthony Albanese said if his party was elected at the election, they would commission the ABC to undertake a feasibility study into extending Double J into regional areas. Albanese declared: “I want more people in regional Australia to experience the joy I have of listening to Double J, singing along to songs they love or maybe discovering something new."

Programming
Arvos is presented by broadcaster and electronic musician Tim Shiel.

J Files

See also
 ABC Country
 ABC Jazz
 Digital radio in Australia
 Triple J

References

External links
 DoubleJ

Australian Broadcasting Corporation radio
Radio stations established in 2002
Internet radio stations in Australia
Digital-only radio stations
Digital radio in Australia
Public radio in Australia
Triple J